Hurricane Olga was the largest tropical cyclone by diameter of gale-force winds on record in the Atlantic at the time, until it was surpassed by Hurricane Igor in 2010, which was subsequently surpassed by Hurricane Sandy in 2012. The fifteenth named storm, ninth and final hurricane of the 2001 Atlantic hurricane season, Olga formed as a subtropical cyclone on November 24. After acquiring tropical characteristics later that day, Olga meandered westward, and eventually reached hurricane status on November 26. Olga peaked as a  Category 1 hurricane before the storm turned southwestward and weakening back into a tropical storm. On November 30 it deteriorated further to a tropical depression, although it re-intensified two days later to tropical storm intensity. Olga then dissipated as a tropical cyclone on December 4 east of the Bahamas. Its damaging effects were limited to ships at sea. The cyclone's remnants produced heavy rainfall across the Bahamas and Florida. It was a relatively rare storm to exist in December, which is outside of the normal Atlantic hurricane season.

Meteorological history

The origins of Hurricane Olga were from the interaction of a cold front and a small weather disturbance in the north Atlantic Ocean, producing an extratropical low east of Bermuda on November 22. The low gradually intensified and acquired subtropical characteristics, developing an area of convection east of the center and accompanied by a large area of gale-force winds. Subsequently, the convection markedly increased and became more concentrated, with hints of an eye feature. Within 12 hours of becoming a subtropical, it is estimated the cyclone transitioned into Tropical Storm Olga; however, it was not purely tropical, due to being positioned beneath an upper-level low. Operationally, the National Hurricane Center (NHC) did not initiate advisories until nine hours later, referring to it as Subtropical Storm Two for two more days.

When advisories first began on Olga, forecasters were uncertain how long the storm would persist, due to the storm's presence within a much larger storm; one hurricane model anticipated an increase in wind shear within 24 hours, which would likely cause quick dissipation. However, the NHC accurately forecasted the storm to remain a cyclone for several days. Olga initially tracked northeastward, followed by a turn to the west due to a building ridge to its north. On November 25, the storm began acquiring more characteristics of a tropical storm, such as detaching from the larger storm and developing more distinct convective rainbands. This was due to decreasing wind shear and continued atmospheric instability, although only marginally warm sea surface temperatures. After turning to the southwest, Olga resumed a northwest motion, and at 1200 UTC on November 26, Olga intensified into a hurricane. By that time, an eye had developed in the center, and the previously large wind field had contracted. Upon attaining hurricane status, Olga was tracking northwestward due to an approaching trough.

On November 28, after finishing the second loop, Olga turned to the southwest due to a building ridge to its northwest. Around the same time, it began a steady weakening trend, due to strong wind shear displacing the convection. The eye became poorly defined as the center became exposed, and on November 29 Olga weakened to tropical storm status. With the thunderstorms rapidly diminishing, the storm weakened quickly, and Olga deteriorated further to a tropical depression on November 30. Forecasters anticipated continued weakening until dissipation, although the cyclone was expected to move over an area of more favorable conditions, including warmer waters and lighter shear. Still existing as a tropical cyclone on December 1, Olga extended the hurricane season beyond its typical boundaries. It continued producing a small area of deep convection, prompting one forecaster to note that "Olga is stubbornly holding on to tropical cyclone status... for now." After a decrease in wind shear, deep convection redeveloped over the center, and Olga re-intensified into a tropical storm on December 2.

At the time, there was uncertainty whether the storm would strengthen further, possibly to near hurricane status, or rapidly weaken. Ultimately, an approaching trough caused weakening by increasing wind shear, while also forcing the storm eastward. On December 4, Olga again weakened to a tropical depression as it lost most of its convection. The remnant circulation turned to the south and west, completing a loop and later moving through the Bahamas before dissipating along the north coast of Cuba on December 7.

Preparations and impact
Forecasters at the National Hurricane Center began issuing advisories on Olga on November 24 anticipating that the storm would threaten shipping lanes in the Atlantic.

In Bermuda, the Bermuda Weather Service issued gale warnings and local marine warnings for boats and other small water craft. The approach of Olga also forced cancellation of the World Yacht regatta, but there was little damage on the island. The hurricane also brought rough seas to the East Coast of the United States, the Bahamas, and as far south and east as the Lesser Antilles. A buoy near Guadeloupe reported  waves. High waves in Florida eroded beaches, threatening the foundations of two homes in Flagler County. The remnants of Olga later produced heavy rainfall across the Bahamas, Cuba and south Florida.

See also

 Timeline of the 2001 Atlantic hurricane season
 Other storms of the same name
 List of Category 1 Atlantic hurricanes
 Hurricane Kyle (2002)

References

Olga
Olga (2001)
Olga (2001)
Olga